Darreh-ye Pir or Darreh Pir may refer to:
 Darreh-ye Pir, Chaharmahal and Bakhtiari
 Darreh-ye Pir, Andika, Khuzestan Province